Girolamo Cialdieri (28 October 1593 - 1680) was an Italian painter from the Baroque period.<ref>Arte e storia, article titled: Girolamo Cialdieri: Pittore e le sue Opere, by Ercole Scatazza, page 106-108.</ref>

Biography
He was born in Urbino and there a pupil of the Veronese Claudio Ridolfi. One of his masterworks is the Martyrdom of St. John'' in San Bartolommeo. Lanzi describes him as possessing great facility of hand and amenity of color, and commends his style of painting landscape and architecture, which he was fond of introducing in the backgrounds of his pictures.

Among his other works are paintings or frescoes for the Sanctuary of the Madonna del Pelingo in Acqualagna; for churches and convents in Cagli, including San Giuseppe, Santa Maria della Misericordia, and the Capuchin church and convent of the Madonna of the Rosary; the church of the Annunziata in Isola del Piano; Santa Maria del Soccorso in Montemaggiore al Metauro; Santa Chiara in Urbania; and San Stefano in Piobbico.

Gallery

References

Attribution:
 

1593 births
1680 deaths
People from Urbino
Umbrian painters
16th-century Italian painters
Italian male painters
17th-century Italian painters